FC Lourdais is a French rugby union club from Lourdes currently competing in the French league system. Formed in 1911, they have won the French league eight times and the French cup six times. They play in the Stade Antoine-Beguere and traditionally wear blue and red jerseys. Their most notable former player is Jean Prat. They are based in Lourdes in Hautes-Pyrénées. The team currently competes in the fourth tier of French rugby, Fédérale 2.

Honors
 French championship:
 Champions: 1948, 1952, 1953, 1956, 1957, 1958, 1960, 1968
 Runners-up: 1945, 1946, 1955
 Challenge Yves du Manoir:
 Champions: 1953, 1954, 1956, 1966, 1967, 1981
 Runners-up: 1977
 Coupe de France:
 Champions: 1950, 1951
 Runners-up: 1948, 1984

Finals results

French championship

Challenge Yves du Manoir

Coupe de France

Notable former players

 
  Jonetani Ralulu
  André Abadie
  Louis Armary
  Michel Arnaudet
  Jean Barthe
  Pierre Berbizier
  Jean Bernon
  Eugène Buzy
  André Campaes
  Manuel Carpentier
  Alain Caussade
  Michel Crauste
  Michel Crémaschi
  Henri Domec
  Mathieu Dourthe
  Clément Dupont
  Jean Estrade
  Bertrand Fourcade
  Romain Froment
  Jean Gachassin
  Jean-Pierre Garuet
  Louis Guinle
  Aubin Hueber
  Antoine Labazuy
  François Labazuy
  Claude Lacaze
  Pierre Lacaze
  Julien Laharrague
  Thomas Mantérola
  Jean-François Marchal
  Roger Martine
  Arnaud Marquesuzaa
  Jean-Henri Mir
  Jean-Pierre Mir
  Jean Prat
  Maurice Prat
  Henri Rancoule
  Ganó Rivero
  Robert Soro
  Iulian Dumitraș
  Sorin Socol
  Sébastien Rouet

See also
 List of rugby union clubs in France

External links
Official Web Site

Lourdes
Lourdes
Sport in Hautes-Pyrénées